"Don't Hurt Yourself" is the second single from Marillion's 13th studio album Marbles, released on 12 July 2004. Following the band's comeback to the upper regions of the UK Singles Chart with  the previous single "You're Gone" in May, it reached number 16, becoming their second-highest charting hit since 1987's "Incommunicado". As with "You're Gone", the chart success of this single was largely based on making it available in two formats and encouraging fans to buy them simultaneously in the first week after their release. It also reached a top 40 position in the Dutch charts.

One of the two available discs contained a version of the Marbles album track "Angelina" mixed by Steven Wilson of Porcupine Tree.

Track list

Version A (Red cover, "Girl")
Don't Hurt Yourself (Single Edit) – 3:45
Fantastic Place (Live)	
The Damage (Live)
Don't Hurt Yourself (Video)

Version B (Blue cover, "Boy")
Don't Hurt Yourself (Single Edit) – 3:45
Angelina (Steven Wilson Mix) – 5:58

Personnel
 Steve Hogarth – vocals
 Mark Kelly – keyboards
 Ian Mosley – drums
 Steve Rothery – guitar
 Pete Trewavas – bass guitar
 Carrie Tree - backing vocals on "Angelina"

Chart positions

References

Marillion songs
2004 singles
Rock ballads
2004 songs
Songs written by Steve Hogarth
Songs written by Steve Rothery
Songs written by Mark Kelly (keyboardist)
Songs written by Pete Trewavas
Songs written by Ian Mosley